Sweden first participated at the Olympic Games at the inaugural 1896 Games, and has sent athletes to compete in every Games since then with one exception, the sparsely attended 1904 Summer Olympics. Sweden has earned medals at all Olympic games except for two, the 1896 Games and the 1904 Games (the latter of which Sweden did not compete at). The only other nation having earned medals at every Olympic game since 1908 is Sweden's neighboring country Finland.

Sweden hosted the Games on one occasion, the 1912 Summer Olympics in Stockholm. The equestrian events of the 1956 Summer Olympics in Melbourne were held in Stockholm, due to quarantine reasons.

Swedish athletes have won a total of 503 medals at the Summer Olympic Games, and another 176 at the Winter Olympic Games.

The International Olympic Committee had Swedish officer and sports instructor Viktor Balck as one of its original members. The Swedish Olympic Committee was created and recognized in 1913.

Medal tables
Sweden hosted the 1912 Summer Olympics in Stockholm. Sweden also hosted the 1956 Summer Olympics Equestrian events in Stockholm.

*Purple border colour indicates tournament was held on home soil. (1912)

Medals by Summer Games

Medals Overall

Medals by Winter Games

Medals by Summer Sport

*This table does not include six medals – three gold, two silver, and one bronze – awarded in the 1908 and 1920 figure skating events.

Best results in non-medalling sports:

Medals by Winter Sport

*This table includes six medals – three gold, two silver, and one bronze – awarded in the 1908 and 1920 figure skating events.

Best results in non-medalling sports:

Individual statistics

Most medals
According to official data of the Swedish Olympic Committee. This is a list of people who have won three or more Olympic gold medals for Sweden. Medals won in the 1906 Intercalated Games are not included. It includes top-three placings in 1896 and 1900, before medals were awarded for top-three placings.

Most appearances

Age records

Hosted Games
Sweden has hosted the Games on one occasion. In 1956, the equestrian competitions were held in Stockholm.

Unsuccessful bids

Summary by Summer sport

Non-participations
Sweden has participated in most summer sports, but they have yet to participate in: Field hockey, Rugby football (neither Rugby sevens or the discontinued discipline Rugby union), Sport climbing and Surfing.

Sweden never participated in the following discontinued sports: Baseball/Softball, Basque pelota, Cricket, Croquet, Jeu de paume, Karate, Lacrosse, Polo, Rackets, Roque and Water motorsports.

Aquatics
For aquatics disciplines, follow these links: Artistic swimming, Diving, Swimming and Water polo.

Archery
Archery was included in the Olympic programme between 1900 and 1920. Sweden first participated in 1972, the same year archery returned to the programme after a 52-year absence. Sweden has participated in the sport every time since then. 

Sweden has won two silver medals in the sport. Gunnar Jervill won the silver medal in men's individual in 1972 and Magnus Petersson won the silver medal in men's individual in 1996. 

The best placements in women's events were 5th by Jenny Sjövall in women's individual in 1988 and by her together with in Lise-Lotte Djerf and Kristina Persson-Nordlander in women's team in 1992.

The most participations in the sport by a Swedish archer is 4, shared between Göran Bjerendal (1980–1988, 1996) and Magnus Petersson (1996–2008).

Artistic swimming
Artistic swimming has been included in the Olympic programme since 1984. Sweden has participated once, in 1988 Marie Jacobsson participated in women's solo and finished 9th.
There are no men's events in the sport.

Athletics
Sweden first competed in track and field athletics in 1896, sending 1 athlete (Henrik Sjöberg) who competed in four events. Sweden's first medal in the sport was a bronze in the 1900 marathon by Ernst Fast.

Sweden has earned 21 gold and 84 total medals in athletics, its second most successful sport after wrestling (28 gold and 86 total). Sweden is tied with Australia for 11th-most golds in the sport (with Australia ranked higher in most sources due to having more silver medals), while its total medal count would place it 8th.

Sweden has had two medal sweeps in the sport. Sweden swept men's triple jump at home soil in 1912. Sweden also swept men's 3000 metres steeplechase in 1948, which is Sweden's most recent medal sweep in any Olympic event. Sweden also got gold, silver and bronze in men's decathlon in 1912, but the gold is shared with an American athlete.

The Swedish athlete with most participations in the sport was John Ljunggren who participated in 5 Olympic Games between 1948 and 1964.

  Tage Brauer was registered to participate too, but sources conflict as to whether he actually participated. He was not included in this count.

Swedish athletes also won 2 gold, 4 silver and 5 bronze medals in athletics at the 1906 Intercalated Games. IOC has retroactively decided to no longer recognize those games as official Olympic games.

Badminton
Badminton has been included in the Olympic programme since 1992. Sweden has participated in the sport in every time it has been included in the Olympic programme. 

Sweden has yet to win any medals in the sport. The best placements were 5th, first by Catrine Bengtsson and Maria Bengtsson in women's doubles in 1992, then equaled by Fredrik Bergström and Johanna Persson	in mixed doubles in 2004.

Basketball
Basketball has been included in the Olympic programme since 1936. Sweden has participated once, in 1980. Sweden men's national basketball team participated in men's 5x5 and finished 10th.

Team basketball

3x3 Basketball
3x3 basketball has been included in the Olympic programme since 2020, but Sweden has yet to participate in the discipline.

Boxing
Boxing has been included in the Olympic programme since 1904 with the exception of the 1912 Games. Sweden first participated in 1924 and has participated most times since then.

They have won eleven medals so far; five silver and six bronze. The silver medals were won by Nils Ramm in men's heavyweight in 1928, Thure Ahlqvist in men's lightweight in 1932, Gunnar Nilsson in men's heavyweight in 1948, Ingemar Johansson in men's heavyweight in 1952 and George Scott in men's lightweight in 1988.

The best placement in a women's event was by Anna Laurell Nash who finished shared 5th in women's middleweight in 2012.

Canoeing

Slalom
Canoe slalom was first included in the Olympic programme in 1972. After that it didn't return until 1992, but it has remained in the programme since then.

Sweden has participated twice. Their best placement was by Erik Holmer who finished 9th in men's K1 in 2020. Sweden has so far not participated in women's events in the discipline.

Sprint
Canoe sprint has been included in the Olympic programme since 1936. Sweden has participated in the discipline every time it has been included in the programme.

Sweden's most successful athlete in the discipline is Gert Fredriksson. He won 8 medals (6 gold, 1 silver, 1 bronze) and remains the most successful male canoeist of any country at the Olympic Games, and the most successful Swedish Olympian in any sport. His Olympic titles came in K1 1000m and K1 10 000m in 1948, K1 1000m in 1952, K1 1000m and K1 10 000m in 1956, and K2 1000m together with Sven-Olov Sjödelius in 1960.

The second most successful Swedish canoeist is Agneta Andersson who won 3 gold, 2 silver and 2 bronze medals. Her Olympic titles came in K1 500m in 1984, K2 500m with Anna Olsson in 1984, and K2 500m with Susanne Gunnarsson in 1996.

Sven-Olov Sjödelius is the remaining Swedish canoeist with two Olympic titles, aside from winning K2 1000m in 1960 with Gert Fredriksson (as listed above), he defended his title by winning K2 1000m in 1964 together with Gunnar Utterberg.

The most Olympic participations by a Swedish sprint canoeist is five, a record shared by three canoeists: Agneta Andersson (1980-1996), Anna Olsson (1984-2000) and Markus Oscarsson (1996-2012).

Cycling

BMX freestyle
BMX freestyle has been included in the Olympic programme since 2020. Sweden has yet to participate in the discipline.

BMX racing
BMX racing has been included in the Olympic programme since 2008. Sweden has yet to participate in the discipline.

Mountain biking
Mountain biking has been included in the Olympic programme since 1996. Sweden has participated many times.

Sweden has won one medal so far; the gold medal Jenny Rissveds gained when she won the women's event in 2016. The best placement in a men's event was by Fredrik Kessiakoff who finished 12th in the men's event in 2004.

Road cycling
Road cycling was included in the Olympic programme in 1896. It returned in 1912 and has remained in the Olympic programme ever since. Sweden first participated in 1912 and has participated in the discipline in every Summer Olympic games since then except for 2020.

Sweden's most successful athlete in the discipline was Ragnar Malm with 1 gold, 1 silver and 1 bronze medal. He won his gold medal together with Erik Friborg, Algot Lönn and Axel Persson in men's team time trial in 1912.

Sweden's two remaining gold medals were won by Harry Stenqvist in men's individual time trial in 1920 and Bernt Johansson in men's individual road race in 1976.

The most successful female Swedish cyclist in the discipline was Emma Johansson who won two silver medals in women's individual road race, first in 2008 and then again in 2016.

The Swedish athlete with most participations in the sport was Michael Lafis who participated in 4 Olympic Games between 1988 and 2000.

Sweden also participated in road cycling at the 1906 Intercalated Games without winning any medals in the discipline. IOC has retroactively decided to no longer recognize those games as official Olympic games.

Track cycling
Track cycling has been included in the Olympic programme since the inaugural 1896 Summer Olympics, with the exception of the 1912 Games held in Sweden.

The best placement was by Andrew Hansson who was one of 9 cyclists to reach the final but who failed to finish top 4 in
men's 20 km in 1908.

Sweden has yet to participate in women's events in the discipline.

Sweden also participated in track cycling at the 1906 Intercalated Games without winning any medals in the discipline. IOC has retroactively decided to no longer recognize those games as official Olympic games.

Diving
Diving has been included in the Olympic programme since 1904. Sweden participated in the sport in every Olympic Games since 1908 except for 2016.

Sweden has had three medal sweeps in the sport; men's 10 metre platform in 1908 and men's plain high diving in 1912 and 1920.

Sweden's most successful athlete in the sport is Erik Adlerz who won gold in both men's 10 metre platform and men's plain high diving in 1912, and won silver in men's 10 metre platform in 1920. The second most successful athlete is Ulrika Knape who won gold in women's 10 metre platform and silver in women's 3 metre springboard in 1972 and silver in women's 10 metre platform in 1976.

The remaining Swedish Olympic champions in the sport are Hjalmar Johansson who won gold in men's 10 metre platform in 1908, Greta Johansson who won gold in women's 10 metre platform in 1912 and Arvid Wallman who won gold in men's plain high diving in 1920. The Swedish athlete with most participations in the sport was Anna Lindberg who participated in 5 Olympic Games between 1996 and 2012.

Sweden also participated in diving at the 1906 Intercalated Games without winning any medals in the discipline. IOC has retroactively decided to no longer recognize those games as official Olympic games.

Equestrian
The Swedish athlete with most participations in the sport was Tinne Vilhelmson-Silfvén who participated in 7 Olympic Games between 1992 and 2016.

Dressage
Dressage had one event included in 1900. It returned to the Olympic programme in 1912 and has remained in the Olympic programme ever since. Sweden participated in the discipline at the 1912 Games and has participated most times since then.

Sweden has had two medal sweeps in the discipline, individual dressage in 1912 and 1920.

Sweden's most successful athlete in the discipline is Henri Saint Cyr who won four gold medals. He won individual dressage in 1952 and 1956 as well as team dressage together with Gustaf Adolf Boltenstern Jr. and Gehnäll Persson both in 1952 and 1956.

Sweden's remaining three gold medals were all won in the individual event. Carl Bonde won in 1912, Janne Lundblad won in 1920 and Ernst Linder won in 1924.

The most successful female Swedish athlete in the discipline was Ulla Håkansson who won bronze in the team event in 1972 and 1984.

The Swedish athlete with most participations in the discipline is Tinne Vilhelmson-Silfvén who participated in 7 Olympic Games between 1992 and 2016.

Eventing

Show jumping
Show Jumping was included in the Olympic programme in 1900. It returned in 1912 and has remained in the Olympic programme ever since. Sweden has first competed in 1912 and has participated most times since then.

Sweden have won four gold medals in show jumping, all in the team jumping event. Gustaf Kilman, Gustaf Lewenhaupt, Hans von Rosen and Fredrik Rosencrantz won in 1912, Claës König, Frank Martin, Daniel Norling and Hans von Rosen won in 1920, Åge Lundström, Axel Ståhle and Åke Thelning won in 1924 and Malin Baryard-Johnsson, Henrik von Eckermann and Peder Fredricson won in 2020.

Sweden's most successful athletes in the discipline are Hans von Rosen who won 2 gold medals (in the team events in 1912 and 1920 as mentioned above) and Peder Fredricson who won 1 gold (in the team event in 2020) and 3 silver medals, in the team event in 2004, and in the individual events in 2016 and 2020.

The most participations in the discipline by a Swedish athlete is 5, by Malin Baryard-Johnsson (1996-2004, 2016–2020), Rolf-Göran Bengtsson (1996, 2004–2016, was also reserve in 2020) and Peter Eriksson (1984, 1992–1996, 2004–2008).

Discontinued disciplines
Equestrian driving was conducted during the 1900 Summer Olympics and equestrian vaulting during the 1920 Summer Olympics. Sweden didn't participate in the event in 1900, but did participate in both events in 1920, winning bronze in team vaulting.

Fencing
Fencing has been included in the Olympic programme since the inaugural 1896 Games. Sweden first participated in 1900 and has participated most times since then.

Sweden has won 7 medals in the sport; 2 gold, 3 silver and 2 bronze. The first gold was won by Rolf Edling, Carl von Essen, Göran Flodström, Leif Högström and Hans Jacobson in men's team épée in 1976. The second was won by Johan Harmenberg in men's épée in 1980.

The best placement in a women's event was 5th, by Kerstin Palm in women's foil in 1968. Kerstin Palm is also the Swedish athlete with most participations in the sport. She became the first woman from any country to participate in 7 Olympic Games by participating in all Summer Games between 1964 and 1988.

Sweden also participated in fencing at the 1906 Intercalated Games without winning any medals in the sport. IOC has retroactively decided to no longer recognize those games as official Olympic games.

Football
Football has been included in the Olympic programme since 1900 with the exception of the 1932 Games. Sweden first participated in 1908. The women's event was added in 1996, and Sweden has participated in every edition of that event.

Sweden has won five medals so far. Sweden's men's team won gold in 1948 and bronze in 1924 and 1952.

Sweden's women's team won silver in 2016 and 2020.

Sweden's most successful male Olympic footballer was Erik Nilsson who won gold in 1948 and bronze in 1952. Sweden's most successful female Olympic footballers are 9 players who won silver in both 2016 and 2020.

The most participations in the sport by a Swedish footballer is 4, shared between Hedvig Lindahl (2008–2020), Lotta Schelin (2004–2016) and Caroline Seger (2008–2020). Hedvig Lindahl was also part of the squad in 2004, but did not play in any games.

  Squad sizes were 18 each for men and women. However, squad member Pauline Hammarlund was replaced during the tournament by alternate Fridolina Rolfö due to injury.

Golf
Golf was originally included in the Olympic programme in 1900 and 1904 but without Swedish participation. Golf returned to the games in 2016, and Sweden has participated in it since.

Henrik Stenson won a silver in men's individual in 2016, which is Sweden's only medal in the sport so far. 

Sweden's best placement in a women's event was by Anna Nordqvist who finished shared 11th in women's individual in 2016.

Gymnastics

Artistic gymnastics
Artistic gymnastics has been included in the Summer Olympic programme since the inaugural 1896 Games. Sweden participated in the discipline at the 1896 Games and has participated frequently since then.

Sweden has won five gold medals in the sport, four of those in team events: men's team in 1908, men's team Swedish system in 1912 and 1920 and women's team portable apparatus in 1952.

Sweden's sole gold medalist in an individual event is William Thoresson who won men's floor in 1952. He also won a silver medal in the same event in 1956 and is the Swedish athlete with most participations in Artistic Gymnastics in the Olympic games as he participated in four Games between 1952 and 1964.

Sweden's most successful athletes in the discipline are seven men who won two gold in team events; Holmberg, Landberg, brothers Norling and Norling, Rosén and Svensson won in 1908 and 1912, and John Sörenson won in 1912 and 1920.

Sweden's most successful female athlete is Ann-Sofi Pettersson-Colling who in women's team portable apparatus won gold in 1952 and silver in 1956, and she also won a bronze in vault in 1956.

Rhythmic gymnastics
Rhythmic gymnastics has been included in the Olympic programme since 1984. Sweden has participated once, in 1984. Viktoria Bengtsson finished 19th in women's individual all-around.

There are no men's events in the discipline.

Trampoline
Trampoline has been included in the Olympic programme since 2000. Sweden has yet to participate in the discipline.

Handball
Handball was included in the Olympic programme in 1936. It returned in 1972 and has remained in the Olympic programme ever since. Sweden first participated in 1972 and has participated in the sport in most Summer Olympic games since then. Sweden has won four medals, all silver, in the sport. Sweden men's national handball team managed to win those in the men's events in 
1992, 1996, 2000 and 2012. The best placements in the women's event was 4th which Sweden women's national handball team achieved in 2020.

Ola Lindgren, Staffan Olsson and Magnus Wislander share the Swedish record for most medals in the sport, with three silver medals each.

The most participations in the sport by a Swedish handballer is 4, shared between Per Carlén (1984–1996), Ola Lindgren (1988–2000), Mats Olsson (1984–1996), Staffan Olsson (1988–2000) and Magnus Wislander (1988–2000).

Judo
Judo has been included in the Olympic programme since 1964 with the exception of the 1968 Games. Sweden first participated in 1972 and has participated most times since then.

Sweden has yet to win any medals in the sport. The best placements were 5th, by Bertil Ström in men's middleweight in 1980, Lars Adolfsson in men's half-middleweight in 1992 and Marcus Nyman in men's middleweight in 2016.

Sweden's best placement in a women's event is 7th, by Katarina Håkansson in women's half-heavyweight in 1992.

Modern pentathlon
Modern pentathlon has been included in the Olympic programme since 1912. Sweden participated in the sport in every Olympic Games from then until 2004. They participated in every event held in the sport from the start in 1912 until 2000.

Participation in the sport started remarkably well for Sweden with their three medal sweeps in the sport occurring in the first three events held: in 1912, 1920 and 1924. Sweden's most successful athlete in the sport is Lars Hall who won gold in men's individual in 1952 and 1956 and silver in men's team in 1952. The second most successful athlete is Bo Lindman who won gold in men's individual in 1924 and silver in men's individual in 1928 and 1932.
The remaining Swedish Olympic champions in the sport are Gösta Lilliehöök who won in 1912, Gustaf Dyrssen in 1920, 
Sven Thofelt in 1928, Johan Oxenstierna in 1932, William Grut in 1948 and Björn Ferm in 1968, all in men's individual.

The sole Swedish woman to participate in modern pentathlon was Jeanette Malm who finished 17th in the women's event in 2000, the first Games where women were allowed to participate in the sport.

Rowing
Rowing has been included in the Olympic programme since 1900. Sweden first participated in 1912 and has participated in the sport in most summer games since then.

Sweden has won two medals in the sport; Bruhn-Möller, Brunkman, Dahlbäck, Rosvall and Wilkens won silver in men's coxed four, inriggers in 1912 and Aronsson, Eriksson, Gunnarsson, Göransson and Larsson won silver in men's coxed four in 1956.

The best placement in a women's event was 4th, by both Marie Carlsson and Carina Gustavsson in women's double sculls in 1984 and by Maria Brandin in women's single sculls in 1996. Maria Brandin is also the Swedish athlete that has most participations in the sport, she participated in 4 Olympic Games between 1988 and 2000.

Sailing
Sailing has been included in the Olympic programme since 1900 with the exception of the 1904 Games. Sweden first participated in 1908 and has participated every time since then.

Sweden's most successful athlete in the sport is Tore Holm who won 2 gold and 2 bronze medals. Together with Yngve Holm, Axel Rydin and Georg Tengwall he won gold in 40m² skerry cruiser in 1920 and together with Martin Hindorff, Åke Bergqvist and Olle Åkerlund he won gold in the 6 metre in 1932.

Sweden's remaining gold medals were won by the following athletes: Ericsson, Hellström, Isberg, Lundén, Nyberg, Rosenswärd, Wallerius and Wallin in 10 metre in 1912; Gösta Bengtsson, Gösta Lundquist and Rolf Steffenburg in 30m² skerry cruiser in 1920; Sven Thorell in 12 foot dinghy in 1928; Folke Bohlin, Bengt Palmquist and Leif Wikström in dragon in 1956; Hjalmar Karlsson, Sture Stork, Lars Thörn in 5.5 metre in 1956; Jörgen Sundelin, Peter Sundelin and Ulf Sundelin in 5.5 metre in 1968; John Albrechtson and Ingvar Hansson in tempest in 1976 and Fredrik Lööf and Max Salminen in star in 2012.

Sweden's most successful female sailors are Birgitta Bengtsson and Marit Söderström who won silver in women's 470 in 1988 and Josefin Olsson who won silver in laser radial in 2020.

The Swedish athlete with most participations in the sport was Fredrik Lööf who participated in 6 Olympic Games between 1992 and 2012.

Shooting
Shooting was included in the inaugural 1896 Summer Olympic programme and has been included in all Summer Games since then except for 1904 and 1928. Sweden first participated in 1908 and has participated in the sport every time it has been included in the programme since then.

Sweden has had two medal sweeps in the sport. During the 1912 Summer Olympics Sweden swept men's 25m small-bore rifle and men's 100 meter running deer, double shots. In the latter event Sweden took all the nine first places, which is the record for Sweden in any Olympic event.

Sweden has three triple Olympic champions in the sport, Vilhelm Carlberg, Alfred Swahn and Oscar Swahn.

Oscar Swahn and his son Alfred Swahn won men's team single-shot running dear in 1908 and men's 100m team running deer in 1912 together.
Oscar Swahn also won men's single-shot running dear in 1908 while Alfred Swahn won men's 100m running deer, single shots.

Oscar Swahn is the oldest Olympic champion, oldest Olympic medalist and oldest Olympic athlete in any sport.

Vilhelm Carlberg got all his three titles in 1912 by winning men's 30m team rapid fire pistol, men's 25m small-bore rifle and men's 25m team small-bore rifle.

Pia Hansen is the only Swedish woman to become Olympic champion in shooting, she won women's double trap in 2000.

The Swedish athlete with most participations in the sport is Ragnar Skanåker who participated in 7 Olympic Games between 1972 and 1996, winning four medals including the gold in mixed 50m pistol in 1972.

Swedish athletes also won one silver and one bronze medal in shooting at the 1906 Intercalated Games. IOC has retroactively decided to no longer recognize those games as official Olympic games.

Skateboarding
Skateboarding was first introduced at the 2020 Summer Olympics. The only Swedish participant so far was Oskar Rozenberg who finished 17th in men's park.

Swimming

Long course swimming
Sweden first competed in swimming in 1900, with one swimmer in three events winning no medals.
The most participations in the sport by Swedish athletes were 6, by Lars Frölander between 1992 and 2012, and Therese Alshammar between 1996 and 2016.

Sweden also participated in swimming at the 1906 Intercalated Games without winning any medals in the discipline. IOC has retroactively decided to no longer recognize those games as official Olympic games.

Marathon swimming
Marathon swimming has been included in the Olympic programme since 2008. Sweden has participated once, Eva Berglund participated in the women's event in 2008 and finished 18th.

Table tennis
Table tennis has been included in the Olympic programme since 1988. Sweden has participated every time. They have won three medals so far; one gold, one silver and one bronze.

Jan-Ove Waldner won gold in men's singles in 1992 and silver in men's singles in 2000. Erik Lindh won a bronze medal in men's singles in 1988. The best placement in a women's event was by Åsa Svensson who finished shared ninth in women's singles in 2000.

The Swedish athlete with most participations in the sport was Jörgen Persson who participated in 7 Olympic Games between 1988 and 2012.

Taekwondo
Taekwondo has been included in the Olympic programme since 2000. Sweden has participated in the sport several times since then but has yet to win any medals in the sport.

The best placement was 4th by Roman Livaja in men's middleweight in 2000. The best placement in a women's event was 5th, both by Karolina Kedzierska in women's heavyweight in 2008 and by Nikita Glasnović in women's featherweight in 2016.

Tennis
Tennis was originally included in the Olympic programme between 1896 and 1924. Tennis returned to the games in 1988 and has remained in the programme since then. Sweden's first participation came in 1908, and Sweden has participated in the sport every time it has been included in the programme since then. 

Sweden has won eight medals in the sport, three silver and five bronze.
The Swedish tennis player with most Olympic medals was Gunnar Setterwall who won two silver medals and two bronze medals. With Sigrid Fick he won silver in mixed outdoor doubles and bronze in mixed indoor doubles in 1912. He also won silver with Carl Kempe in men's indoor doubles the same year and bronze with Wollmar Boström in men's indoor doubles in 1908. Sweden's remaining silver medal was won by Simon Aspelin and Thomas Johansson in men's doubles in 2008.

Triathlon
Triathlon has been included in the Olympic programme since 2000. Sweden has one medal in the sport so far, Lisa Nordén earned the silver medal in the women's event in 2012. Sweden's sole participation in men's events so far was by Joachim Willén who finished 35th in the men's event in 2000.

Tug of war
Tug of War was contested five times, from the 1900 Olympic games in Paris until the 1920 Olympic games in Antwerp.

Sweden participated twice as its own team - in 1908 and at home in Stockholm in 1912, where Sweden won the gold medal. The winning athletes were Andersson, Bergman, Edman, Fredriksson, Gustafsson, Jonsson, Larsson and Lindström.

At the 1900 Games, three Swedish athletes teamed up with three Danish athletes to form a mixed team that won the gold medal in tug of war.

There were no women's events held in the sport.

Sweden also won the bronze medal in tug of war at the 1906 Intercalated Games. IOC has retroactively decided to no longer recognize those games as official Olympic games.

Volleyball

Beach volleyball
Beach volleyball has been included in the Olympic programme since 1996. Sweden has participated three times.

The best placement was by Björn Berg and Simon Dahl who finished 9th in the men's event in 2004. Sweden has so far not participated in women's events in the discipline.

Indoor volleyball
Indoor volleyball has been included in the Olympic programme since 1964. Sweden has participated once, Sweden men's national volleyball team finished 7th in the men's event in 1988.

Water polo
Water polo has been included in the Olympic programme since 1900 with the exception of the 1904 Games. Sweden first participated in 1908 and has participated eight times in total.

Sweden men's national water polo team has won three medals in the men's event, a silver in 1912 and bronzes in 1908 and 1920.

Sweden's most successful athletes in the sport are Robert Andersson, Pontus Hanson, Harald Julin and Torsten Kumfeldt who all have one silver and two bronze medals. They participated together all three times Sweden men's national water polo team managed to medal.

Sweden has yet to participate in women's events in the sport.

Weightlifting
Weightlifting was first included in the Olympic programme at the inaugural 1896 Summer Olympics. It was excluded from the 1900, 1908 and 1912 Games but have been included every other time. Sweden first participated in the sport in 1920 and has participated most times since then.

Sweden has won four medals in the sport, all bronze. Albert Pettersson won bronze in men's middleweight in 1920 and Erik Pettersson won bronze in men's light heavyweight the same year.
Gösta Magnusson won bronze in men's light heavyweight in 1948 and Hans Bettembourg won bronze in men's middle heavyweight in 1972.

Sweden's best placement in a women's event was by Patricia Strenius who finished 4th in women's light heavyweight in 2020.

Sweden also participated in weightlifting at the 1906 Intercalated Games without winning any medals in the sport. The IOC has retroactively decided to no longer recognize those games as official Olympic games.

Wrestling

Freestyle

Greco-Roman

Summary by Winter sport

Non-participations
Sweden has participated in all winter sports except Skeleton.

Alpine skiing
Alpine skiing has been included in the Olympic programme since 1936. Sweden has participated in the sport in every time except for 1960.

Sweden's most successful Olympic athletes in alpine skiing are Pernilla Wiberg (2 gold, 1 silver), Ingemar Stenmark (2 gold, 1 bronze) and Anja Pärson (1 gold, 1 silver, 4 bronze).

Pernilla Wiberg won her gold medals in women's giant slalom in 1992 and women's combined in 1994. Ingemar Stenmark won both men's giant slalom and men's slalom in 1980. Anja Pärson won gold in women's slalom in 2006.

Sweden's remaining Olympic champions in alpine skiing are Frida Hansdotter who won women's slalom in 2018, André Myhrer who won men's slalom the same year and
Sara Hector who won women's giant slalom in 2022.

The most Olympic participations in the sport by Swedish athletes are 5, by Fredrik Nyberg between 1992 and 2006, and by Patrik Järbyn between 1994 and 2010.

Biathlon
Biathlon events were conducted at the 1924 Winter Olympics under the designation military patrol, without Swedish participation. Biathlon returned to the games in 1960. Sweden participated then and has continued to do so ever since.
There was only one biathlon event in the 1960 Winter Olympics. Klas Lestander won the gold in that event, men's individual, and thus won Sweden's first gold in biathlon.

Sweden's most successful athlete in the sport is Hanna Öberg with 2 gold and 1 silver. She won gold in women's individual in 2018 and gold together with her sister Elvira Öberg as well as Mona Brorsson and Linn Persson in women's relay in 2022. Elvira is the second most successful Swedish athlete in the sport with 2 individual silver medals on top of her relay gold.

Sebastian Samuelsson is Sweden's most successful male biathlete. He won silver in men's pursuit and gold together with Peppe Femling, Fredrik Lindström and Jesper Nelin in men's relay, both in 2018.

The two remaining Swedish biathletes to win Olympic gold are Anna-Carin Olofsson-Zidek who won gold in women's mass start in 2006 and Björn Ferry who won gold in men's pursuit in 2010.

The most participations in the sport by a Swedish biathlete is 4, shared between Leif Andersson (1984–1994), Carl Johan Bergman (2002–2014), Björn Ferry (2002–2014) and Mikael Löfgren (1988–1998).

Bobsleigh
Bobsleigh has been included in the Olympic programme since the inaugural 1924 Winter Olympics, with the exception of the 1960 Games. Sweden first participated in the sport in 1952 and has participated several times since then.

Sweden's best placement in the sport is 6th, by Fernström, Holmström, Landgren and Lapidoth in four-man in 1952 and by Carl-Erik Eriksson and Jan Johansson in two-man in 1972.

The best placement in a women's event was 14th, by Lina Engren and Karin Margareta Olsson in two-woman in 2002.

The Swedish athlete with most participations in the sport was Carl-Erik Eriksson who participated in 6 Olympic Games between 1964 and 1984.

Cross-country skiing
Cross-country skiing has been was included in the Olympic programme since the inaugural 1924 Winter Olympics. Sweden has participated in the sport every time it has been included in the programme and has even participated in every event held in the sport.

Sweden has had three medal sweeps in the sport, men's 50 km in 1928 and 1936 as well as men's 18 km in 1948.

The Swedish cross-country skiers with most Olympic medals are Sixten Jernberg (4 gold, 3 silver, 2 bronze) and Charlotte Kalla (3 gold, 6 silver). Gunde Svan (4 gold, 1 silver, 1 bronze) and Thomas Wassberg (4 gold) have also won four Olympic titles in cross-country skiing.

The Swedish athlete with most participations in the sport is Torgny Mogren who participated in 5 Olympic Games between 1984 and 1998.

Curling
Curling was included in the Olympic programme during the inaugural 1924 Winter Olympics. It didn't return until 1998, but has remained in the Games since then. Sweden has participated in the sport every time it has been included in the programme.

Sweden has won four gold medals in the sport. Its most successful athletes are Anna Le Moine, Cathrine Lindahl, Eva Lund and Anette Norberg who won two gold medals together in the women's event; in 2006 with Ulrika Bergman and in 2010 with Kajsa Bergström.

Sweden's remaining gold medals were won by Anna Hasselborg, Agnes Knochenhauer, Sofia Mabergs, Sara McManus and Jennie Wåhlin in the women's event in 2018 and by Niklas Edin, Oskar Eriksson, Daniel Magnusson, Christoffer Sundgren and Rasmus Wranå in the men's event in 2022.

Niklas Edin (1 gold, 1 silver, 1 bronze) and Oskar Eriksson (1 gold, 1 silver, 2 bronze) are the most successful male Swedish curlers. They are also the Swedish curlers with most Olympic participations in the sport; they participated together in four Olympic Games between 2010 and 2022.

Figure skating
Figure skating was first included in the Olympic programme in the 1908 and 1920 Summer Olympics. It was moved to the Winter Olympics with the inaugural 1924 Winter Olympics and has been included in every Winter Olympic Games. Sweden did participate in the sport in its inaugural 1908 competitions and has participated most times since then.

Sweden has had one medal sweep in the sport, men's singles during the 1908 Summer Olympics.

Sweden's most successful athlete in the sport was Gillis Grafström who won gold in men's singles in 1920, 1924 and 1928 and silver in the same discipline in 1932. He's the only figure skater with four medals in the same event. He's also the Swedish figure skater with most Olympic participations in the sport with those four.

The other two Swedish Olympic champions in the sport are Ulrich Salchow who won gold in men's singles in 1908 and Magda Julin who won gold in ladies' singles in 1920.

Freestyle skiing
Freestyle skiing has been included in the Olympic programme since 1992. Sweden has participated in the sport in every time it has been included in the Olympic programme.

Sweden has won six medals in the sport, of which two are gold. Walter Wallberg won gold in men's moguls in 2022 and Sandra Näslund won gold in women's ski cross in 2022.

Marie Lindgren won silver in women's aerials in 1994. Anna Holmlund won bronze in women's ski cross in 2014. Henrik Harlaut won bronze in men's big air and Jesper Tjäder in men's slopestyle, both in 2022.

Ice hockey
Ice hockey was first included in the Olympic programme in the 1920 Summer Olympics. It was moved to the Winter Olympics with the inaugural 1924 Winter Olympics and has been included in every Winter Olympic Games.

Sweden has participated in every event in the sport except for the 1932 men's tournament (due to the Great Depression) and the 1976 men's tournament due to a boycott against amateur rules.

Sweden's men's team has won the gold twice, in 1994 and in 2006.
Sweden's women's team's best result was in 2006 when they won the silver.

Sweden's most successful athletes in the sport are Peter Forsberg, Jörgen Jönsson and Kenny Jönsson with two gold medals. Sweden's most successful women athletes were 11 players who participated in 2002 winning bronze and 2006 winning silver.
The Swedish athlete with most participations in the sport was Daniel Alfredsson who participated in 5 Olympic Games between 1998 and 2014.

Luge
Luge has been included in the Olympic programme since 1964. Sweden first participated in the sport in 1968 and has participated several times since then.

Sweden's best placement in the sport is 6th, by Hans Kohala and Carl-Johan Lindqvist in doubles in 1992.

The best placement in a women's event was 13th, both by Berit Salomonsson in women's singles in 1968 and Agneta Lindskog in women's singles in 1980.

Nordic combined
Nordic combined has been included in the Olympic programme since the inaugural 1924 Winter Games. Sweden participated in the inaugural games and participated many times in the beginning but they have not participated in the sport since the 1972 Games.

Sweden has won two medals in the sport. Bengt Eriksson won silver at the individual event in 1956 and
Sven Israelsson won bronze in the individual event in 1948.

There are no women's events in the sport.

Short track speed skating
Short track speed skating was introduced to the Olympic programme in 1992. Sweden has participated in the sport 3 times.

The best placement was by Martin Johansson who finished 7th in men's 500 metres in 1994. Sweden has yet to participate in women's events in the sport.

Ski jumping
Ski jumping has been included in the Olympic programme since the inaugural 1924 Winter Games. Sweden has participated most times since then.

Sweden has obtained two medals in the sport. Sven Selånger won silver in the event in 1936 and Karl Holmström won bronze in the event in 1952.

Sweden's best placement in a women's event is 16th, by Frida Westman in women's normal hill in 2022.

Snowboarding
Snowboarding has been included in the Olympic programme since 1998. Sweden has participated in the sport in every time it has been included in the Olympic programme.

Sweden has won one medal in the sport so far, Richard Richardsson won silver in men's parallel giant slalom in 2002. The best placement in a women's event was by Maria Danielsson who finished 6th in women's snowboard cross in 2006.

Speed skating
Speed skating has been was included in the Olympic programme since the inaugural 1924 Winter Olympics. Sweden has participated in the sport every Winter Olympic Games except for 1998.

The most successful Swedish speed skater is Tomas Gustafson (3 gold, 1 silver). He won gold in men's 5000m in 1984 and 1988 and gold in men's 10000m in 1988 and silver in the same event in 1984.

Sweden's second most successful speed skater is Nils van der Poel who won gold in men's 5000m and men's 10 000m in 2022.

Sweden's remaining four Olympic titles in the sport all came in men's 10 000m. Åke Seyffarth won gold in 1948, Sigvard Ericsson in 1956, Jonny Nilsson in 1964 and Johnny Höglin in 1968.

Sweden's best placement in a women's event is 4th, by Ann-Sofie Järnström in women's 500m in 1980.

The Swedish athlete with most participations in the sport was Örjan Sandler who participated in 5 Olympic Games between 1964 and 1980.

Medals at subsequently de-recognized competitions
Art competitions held at Summer Olympics between 1912 and 1948, and the 1906 Intercalated Games are no longer recognized as official Olympic medal competitions by the IOC. 

Sweden won 2 gold and 2 bronze medals in art competitions, and 2 gold, 5 silver and 7 bronze medals at the Intercalated Games.

See also
 List of flag bearers for Sweden at the Olympics
 List of Swedish Olympic medalists
 :Category:Olympic competitors for Sweden
 Sweden at the Paralympics

References

External links